Donal Francis Logue (born February 27, 1966) is a Canadian actor. He starred in the film The Tao of Steve and has had roles in the TV series Sons of Anarchy, Vikings, Grounded for Life, Copper, Terriers, and, as Detective Harvey Bullock on Fox's Gotham. He additionally played the recurring role of Lt. (later Captain) Declan Murphy in NBC's Law & Order: Special Victims Unit.

Early life
Donal Francis Logue was born in Ottawa, Ontario, to Irish parents from County Kerry. His parents were Carmelite missionaries, and the family moved from Ireland to Canada to Boston and elsewhere before settling in Calexico, California, in the state's Imperial Valley. There and in nearby El Centro, California, Logue grew up with three sisters—Karina, Deirdre and Eileen—and their mother taught at Calexico High School and Vincent Memorial Catholic High School. Logue attended Central Union High School in El Centro, where he became interested in theater. With friend John Everly during what Logue called the "summer during our sophomore year", he created the theater group Imperial Valley Players to perform in the school's auditorium, mounting the theater of the absurd play Picnic on the Battlefield by Fernando Arrabal.

For part of his junior year of high school, Logue attended the Jesuit school St. Ignatius' College in Enfield Town, London, England. In 1983, while a high-school senior, Donal was elected president of the 37th session of the American Legion Boys Nation, representing California and becoming the first non-citizen elected Boys Nation president. He went on to study history at Harvard University, graduating in 1988. In the late 1980s, he worked as a road manager for such bands as Bullet LaVolta.

Career
After a few appearances in made-for-TV films, Logue appeared in the 1992 film Sneakers, playing Dr. Gunter Janek. Of his career start, Logue recalled,

In 1993, he portrayed Capt. Ellis Spear in Gettysburg, and a movie agent, Judd Bromell, on the Northern Exposure episode "Baby Blues", then later appeared as an FBI agent in The X-Files episode "Squeeze." Logue's character Jimmy The Cab Driver was a staple of MTV promos in the early 1990s. He also appeared in Blade and The Patriot, in 2000. He appeared in two of Edward Burns films: Purple Violets and The Groomsmen.

Logue's portrayal as the lead in The Tao of Steve won him a Special Grand Jury Prize for best actor at the 2000 Sundance Film Festival, and was noticed by ER producer John Wells, who cast Logue in several episodes as Chuck Martin, a nurse Dr. Susan Lewis marries one weekend in Las Vegas on a whim, and later has a child with. Concurrent with the run on ER, Logue starred in the critically acclaimed comedy Grounded for Life. In December 2005, Logue had a pilot development deal for a new situation comedy on ABC television, originally titled I Want to Rob Mick Jagger. The pilot was picked up and debuted in the winter of 2006 under the name The Knights of Prosperity. The show disappeared from the ABC lineup in early March 2007.

Logue also appeared in a supporting role in Just Like Heaven (2005). Logue had appeared as Phil Stubbs in the original pilot for the NBC show Ed, but dropped out to star in the sitcom Grounded for Life. The first two and a half seasons of Grounded for Life were telecast on the Fox network; thereafter, the show moved to The WB for the remainder of its run. In 2002 and 2003, Logue appeared on the VH1 I Love... instalments  '80s, '70s, and '80s Strikes Back. In 2010, Logue appeared on House, M.D. as millionaire patient Curtis Harry.

Logue also appeared in NBC's The Dennis, in 2005, about a former child prodigy whose parents kick him out of the house and into the real world. It was not picked up, however. Logue co-starred with Nicolas Cage in the film Ghost Rider, the David Fincher film Zodiac, and alongside Mark Wahlberg in the 20th Century Fox film Max Payne. In 2008, Logue appeared in the Jack Kerouac documentary One Fast Move or I'm Gone: Kerouac's Big Sur. Logue starred as Captain Kevin Tidwell in the NBC crime drama Life from 2008 to 2009. On May 4, 2009, NBC announced Life would not be returning for a third season.

Logue starred in FX series Terriers, which ran 13 episodes from September to December 2010. After the show's cancellation, a frustrated Logue briefly left acting for truck-driving, according to his friend and fellow actor W. Earl Brown. Logue starred as the main character in Theory of a Deadman's music video for the song "Lowlife", off their 2011 release The Truth Is....

In late 2012, Logue joined the casts of Sons of Anarchy as renegade ex-U.S. Marshal Lee Toric who is out for revenge for the murder of his sister and Vikings as King Horik. In 2013, he joined the cast of BBC America's show Copper as a returning Union General turned Tammany Hall insider, General Brendan Donovan, and he returned to Sons of Anarchy and Vikings to reprise his roles from the previous seasons. Logue had roles in two 2013: CBGB with Alan Rickman and 9 Full Moons with Amy Seimetz and Bret Roberts.

Between March and May 2014, he appeared in six episodes of the NBC police procedural, crime, legal drama, Law & Order: Special Victims Unit as Lieutenant Declan Murphy, a former undercover officer appointed as acting commander of the Special Victims Unit. From 2014 to the show's conclusion in 2019, he portrayed Harvey Bullock in the police procedural series Gotham, based on the DC Comics Batman franchise.

In 2015, Logue appeared in Adam Massey's thriller film The Intruders.

Personal life

Logue travels back and forth to Killarney, County Kerry, Ireland, where his mother lives, and holds both Irish and Canadian citizenship.

Logue has homes in Los Angeles and in Shady Cove, Oregon, where he cofounded Frison Logue Hardwood. Logue regularly plays for the Los Angeles–based amateur soccer team Hollywood United.

Logue has a Class-A Commercial Drivers License and is licensed to drive tractor-trailers with double or triple trailers, tankers and hazardous materials. He has a hardwood company with one partner called Frison-Logue Hardwood, and a trucking company called Aisling Trucking with two partners based out of Central Point, Oregon, which the three founded in 2012.

Logue was formerly married or in a long-term committed relationship with Kasey Walker, also known as Kasey Smith. They have a son named Finn, and a transgender daughter, Jade. On June 27, 2017, Logue posted a tweet saying Jade had gone missing; he later deleted it and launched a wider public appeal for help after contacting police and the National Center for Missing and Exploited Children. By July 8, over a week later, Jade had been found in North Carolina and was returned home safely.

Filmography

Film

Television

Published works

References

External links

T.V. Guide interview
Film Threat interview
Filmmaker magazine interview

Male actors from California
Male actors from Ottawa
Canadian emigrants to the United States
Canadian male film actors
Canadian male television actors
Canadian male voice actors
Harvard University alumni
Hollywood United players
Irish male film actors
Irish male television actors
Canadian people of Irish descent
People from El Centro, California
People from Central Point, Oregon
20th-century Canadian male actors
21st-century Canadian male actors
1960s births
Living people
Association footballers not categorized by position
Association football players not categorized by nationality